Rafael António Correia (5 April 1915 – October 1958), was a Portuguese footballer, who played as forward.

International career 

Correia gained 6 caps for the Portugal national team, and made his debut 6 November 1938 against Switzerland in Lausanne, in a 0-1 defeat.

Death 

After his retirement from football, he ran a bar in Trafaria, Portugal. Italian newspaper La Stampa reported on 17 October 1958 that Correia, probably to avenge some slanders about him, assaulted three men with a gun, killing one of them and seriously injuring the other two, and finally shot himself.

External links

References

1915 births
Sportspeople from Almada
1958 deaths
C.F. Os Belenenses players
Portugal international footballers
Portuguese footballers
Primeira Liga players
Association football forwards